The following lists events that happened during 1823 in Chile.

Incumbents
Supreme Director of Chile: Bernardo O'Higgins (-28 January), Ramón Freire (4 April-)

President of the Government Junta of Chile (1823): Agustín Eyzaguirre (28 January-4 April)

Events
date unknown - Slavery is abolished in Chile.

January
28 January - O'Higgins is deposed by a conservative coup. An interim Government Junta takes power.

Births
1 January - Manuel Baquedano (d. 1897)
19 January - Francisco Bilbao (d. 1865)

Deaths

References 

 
1820s in Chile
Chile
Chile